Nashville is an unincorporated community in Washington County, Nebraska, United States.

History
A post office was established at Nashville in 1923, and remained in operation until it was discontinued in 1929.  In November 2008 a manufacturing plant located in Nashville, PK Manufacturing, was destroyed in a large fire caused by arson in an insurance fraud scheme.

Geography
Nashville is located at  (41.406388, -95.996388), just north of Omaha along U.S. Route 75. It is approximately four miles south of Fort Calhoun.

See also 
 Washington County Historical Association

References

Unincorporated communities in Washington County, Nebraska
Unincorporated communities in Nebraska